
The Kill Van Kull is a tidal strait between Staten Island, New York and Bayonne, New Jersey in the United States. The Robbins Reef Light marks the eastern end of the  Kill, Bergen Point its western end. It is spanned by the Bayonne Bridge and is one of the most heavily traveled waterways in the Port of New York and New Jersey.

Historically, it has been one of the most important channels for the commerce of the region, providing a passage for marine traffic between Upper New York Bay and the industrial towns of northeastern New Jersey. During the colonial era, it played a significant role in travel between New York and the southern colonies, with passengers changing from ferries to coaches at Elizabethtown (now Elizabeth).

Since the final third of the 20th century, it has provided the principal access for oceangoing container ships to Port Newark-Elizabeth Marine Terminal, the busiest port facility in the eastern United States, and Howland Hook Marine Terminal. The strait has required continued dredging and deepening to accommodate the passage of ever-larger ships. In many areas, the sandy bottom has been excavated down to rock and required blasting.  The Bayonne Bridge's deck was raised in 2017 so that New Panamax ships could travel the Kill Van Kull.

Collins Park in Bayonne is situated along the northern shore.

Etymology
Kill Van Kull translates as "channel of the pass" or "ridge". Nearby is the Arthur Kill, the name of which is an Anglicization of the Dutch achter kill meaning "back channel", referring to its location "behind" Staten Island.

The name "Kill Van Kull" originated in the early 17th century, during the Dutch colonial era, when the region was part of New Netherland. Places were named by early explorers and settlers in reference to their shape, topography, or other geographic qualities. The area around Newark Bay was called Achter Kol. The bay lies behind Bergen Hill, the emerging ridge of the Hudson Palisades which begins on Bergen Neck, the peninsula between it and the Upper New York Bay.  Behind or achter the ridge was a col or mountain pass to the interior. 

Kill comes from the Middle Dutch word kille meaning creek. Compare Dordtse Kil in the Netherlands. The bay was known as Cull Bay during the British colonial era.

Gallery

See also
Port Richmond, Staten Island
Port Johnston Coal Docks
Geography of New York-New Jersey Harbor Estuary
List of crossings of the Hackensack River
List of crossings of the Lower Passaic River
Sandy Hook Pilots
Christopher O. Ward

References

 Water upgrade for Kill Van Kull, Staten Island Advance, May 20, 2010
 New York Daily News articles re: Kill Van Kull

Bayonne, New Jersey
New Netherland
Straits of New Jersey
Straits of Richmond County, New York
Bodies of water of Staten Island
Bodies of water of Hudson County, New Jersey
Borders of New York (state)
Borders of New Jersey
Port of New York and New Jersey